Kurt Campbell (born July 30, 1982) is a former professional gridiron football linebacker. He was drafted in the seventh round by the Green Bay Packers in 2005. He played college football at Albany.

Campbell was also a member of the Oakland Raiders, Tennessee Titans and Calgary Stampeders.

1982 births
Living people
American football linebackers
Canadian football linebackers
Albany Great Danes football players
Green Bay Packers players
Oakland Raiders players
Tennessee Titans players
Calgary Stampeders players
Jamaican players of American football
Sportspeople from Kingston, Jamaica